BBK/BRNK, also known as , is a Japanese anime television series created by Sanzigen to celebrate their 10th anniversary. It aired from January 2016 to March 2016. The opening theme is "Beat your Heart" by Konomi Suzuki and the ending theme is "Anger/Anger" by Myth & Roid. The series is available for legal streaming on Crunchyroll.

A second season announced at the end of the first season's final episode, subtitled  aired from October 2016 to December 2016. The opening theme is "Reirō taru Junketsu wa 'Kōen' no Kairai o Hayarase, Gyōten ni Kirameku Akashi o Kizamu" by Megumi Han, and the ending theme is "so beautiful ;- )" by Mikako Komatsu.

Plot 
Azuma Kazuki is a young boy living with his family on Treasure Island (宝島), a floating island several thousand feet above Earth that is inhabited by giant sentient robots called Buranki (ブランキ), all of which are "sleeping". However, several of the Buranki are starting to wake up, forcing Migiwa Kazuki, his mother, to send Azuma, his identical twin sister Kaoruko, and their father down to Earth in a Buranki named Oubu for safety, leaving her behind.

Ten years later, Azuma, returning to a post-apocalyptic Shinjuku is captured by the authorities, but was saved by his childhood friend Kogane Asabuki, a user of a sentient weapon known as Bubuki (ブブキ), which also forms a Buranki's limbs. Discovering he is a Bubuki-user himself with the Heart of Oubu, Azuma and Kogane unite with three other Bubuki-users: Hiiragi Nono, Kinoa Ōgi and Shizuru Taneomi, to work together to seek and revive the lost Oubu, and discover the hidden truths behind the Buranki and the mysterious Reoko Banryū's tyranny over the post-apocalyptic Japan with her own Buranki: Entei.

Characters

Oubu
 is a powerful Buranki once owned by Migiwa Kazuki. When the Buranki on Treasure Island started to awaken ten years prior to the series, she had her husband and two children sent down to Earth with it, crash landing into Japan's shores and causing much destruction in its wake. At some point, its limbs were reverted into Bubukis and returned to their owners, and all that remains is its skeletal husk stored in an underground Buranki Jail. In the present day, Oubu's Bubuki has been inherited by the children of their owners, now working with Migiwa's son Azuma, who has inherited its Heart, to reawaken Oubu and travel back to Treasure Island to find out the truth behind the Burankis.

,  (junior)
A kindhearted young boy with a strong sense of justice, he returns to Japan at the start of the series only to be arrested by the Bubuki Police while clueless to what a Bubuki is, as he has lived his childhood on Treasure Island full of full-sized Burankis and has never seen one split into its Bubuki parts. After Kogane rescues him and he meets the other Bubuki-users, he awakens his own Bubuki while trying to protect Righty: , which he unknowingly had inherited from his mother. As a Heart-user, Azuma is able to awaken and assemble Oubu, as well as act as one with it as its main controller, though as such, when Oubu takes damage, he would also feel the pain, and Oubu's performance also depends on his emotional and physical condition.

A young girl who is Azuma's childhood best friend. Her Bubuki forms Oubu's right arm.

An arrogant young boy who desires to seek revenge on Reoko Banryū for her tyranny, and self-proclaimed leader of Oubu's team. His Bubuki forms Oubu's left leg.

A brazen young girl who wears glasses. Her Bubuki is a pair of swords named  and  that are able to fly, and they form Oubu's left arm. Years before the story, the very thought of using her bubuki terrified her. However, Soya, pretending to be a government agent, convinced her to trust them, seducing her in the process.

A quiet girl who goofed around, though she is not really as she seems.

Entei
 is a Buranki owned by Reoko Banryū, rivalling Oubu in terms of power. 24 years prior to the series, a battle between the two Buranki ended up with Entei's limbs being permanently torn apart and destroyed, while Reoko mysteriously gained immortality as an outcome of the conflict. Since then, Entei uses a pair of pseudo tentacle-like limbs to battle, with Reoko constantly on the hunt for spare Hearts and parts strong enough to withstand Entei's power to once again complete Entei and exact her revenge on Oubu and Migiwa.

A young woman who once wielded , she and Migiwa were best friends back in high school. When she was told she only had three years left to live, she decided to make Entei and the other Buranki known to the world, but Migiwa interfered in this to save her: Destroying Entei's limbs with Oubu, Migiwa crushed Entei's Heart, causing a new Core to painfully manifest within Reoko, turning her into Entei's new Heart and granting her immortality as a result. Following the years, having been locked up in Migiwa's mansion, Reoko becomes conflicted about her unchanging appearance despite the many years that has passed and starts to feel hatred and repulse towards Migiwa. Released upon Migiwa's departure to Treasure Island, Reoko reunites with her comrades as they overthrow the government that has been killing Bubuki-users, creating a new one that serves as her puppet for her plans to exact revenge against Migiwa for what she has done to her.
Being Entei's Heart herself, her powers are similar to Azuma's, though with every time she controls Entei she brings fatal damage onto herself, and despite her body being able to revive and restore itself to a near-perfect condition, the brain-damage she receives cannot recover, her memories eventually being eaten away every time she dies.

The oldest among the Four Heavenly Kings, his unnamed Bubuki is a pistol that like Tsurarai, can fire bullets that home in on their targets to hit their mark, but its bullets are stronger than those fired by Tsurarai. He previously formed Entei's right arm.

One of the Four Heavenly Kings who previously fooled Oubu's users into her plans under the alias . Her unnamed Bubuki is a pocketwatch that allows her to transcend time and space for a few seconds, while its hands can extend to be used as blades. She previously formed Entei's left leg.

The youngest among the Four Heavenly Kings, he is also Reoko's doctor, and the most concerned regarding her condition. His unnamed Bubuki is a set of rings that creates illusions, as well as being able to fire lasers. He previously formed Entei's left arm.

A genius and strategist of the Four Heavenly Kings, he was also Shizuru's former mentor. His unnamed Bubuki is a fountain pen that is able to turn what it writes into reality (such as writing  would cancel out an attack), and produce a laser blade. He previously formed Entei's right leg.

United States
A team of Bubuki-users from America, representing their Buranki . Due to their Buranki being rendered unusable as a result of Migiwa releasing an energy wave that deactivates all Buranki Hearts on Earth, they have been sent to Japan by a mysterious benefactor to fight Oubu's and Entei's teams for their working Hearts. Their Bubuki are named after film directors.

User of the Bubuki , which forms Megalara's right arm.

User of the Bubuki , which forms Megalara's left arm.

User of the Bubuki , a tommy gun which forms Megalara's left foot.

User of the Bubuki , a mace which forms Megalara's right foot.

Russia
The last of a clan of assassins, the Bubuki-users from Russia represent their Buranki . However, just like the United States' team, their Heart was deactivated by Migiwa, and are thus sent by the same mysterious benefactor to Japan retrieve functioning Hearts from Oubu's and Entei's teams, although using more rough and violent methods to achieve their goal.

Due to being born and raised of an elite status, he harbors a superiority complex, often treating his leg Bubuki-users like dirty rats due to their lack of a home or status, and will not hesitate to sacrifice others to achieve his goals.

Maxim's younger sister and Diana's older twin sister. She and her sister often target Shizuru due to also having been mentored by Akihito. She uses the Bubuki , a scythe which forms Zanpaza's right arm.

Maxim's younger sister and Lyudmila's younger twin sister. She and her sister often target Shizuru due to also having been mentored by Akihito. She uses the Bubuki , a hammer which forms Zanpaza's left arm.

A young man who remains faithfully loyal to the Arsenyevna twins despite how cruel their brother treats him and Dersu for being homeless street rats. He uses the Bubuki , a saw which forms Zanpaza's left leg.

A quiet young boy who shows almost no emotions and is Ignat's best friend. He uses the Bubuki , a staff which forms Zanpaza's right leg.

Episode list

BBK/BRNK

BBK/BRNK: The Gentle Giants of the Galaxy

References

External links
 

Kadokawa Dwango franchises
Anime with original screenplays
Mecha anime and manga
Sanzigen
Tokyo MX original programming